Protein HEXIM1 is a protein that in humans is encoded by the HEXIM1 gene.

Interactions 

HEXIM1 has been shown to interact with Cyclin T1 and Cdk9

References

Further reading